The American Medical Society for Sports Medicine (AMSSM) is a large sports medicine membership organization, representing over 3000 physicians in the United States, established in 1991. AMSSM includes members who serve as team physicians at the youth level, NCAA, NFL, MLB, NBA, WNBA, MLS, and NHL, as well as with Olympic and Paralympic teams.

Sports medicine practice in the United States

Sports medicine is a subspecialty area of medicine in the USA. The AMSSM represents non-surgical sports medicine physicians (MDs) practicing primary care sports medicine. The primary specialty options for non-surgical sports medicine practice in the USA are multiple, including family practice, physiatry, pediatrics, internal medicine and emergency medicine.

Sport and exercise medicine physicians are able to prescribe pharmaceuticals, use diagnostic ultrasound and order other radiological imaging and blood tests, perform minor surgical procedures as well as advising on exercise prescription. Branches of particular interest include concussion in sport and sports cardiology.

The AMSSM is differentiated from other sports medicine organizations in the US as follows:
 The American Orthopaedic Society for Sports Medicine is the primary surgical subspecialty organization for MDs (orthopedic surgeons)
 The American Osteopathic Academy of Sports Medicine is the primary sports medicine organization for DOs.
 The American College of Sports Medicine is the broader organization which includes both physicians and non-physicians, like Athletic Trainers and Exercise Physiologists and other Sports Scientists.

Position Statements

The AMSSM publishes multiple Position Statements including on concussion, cardiac screening of athletes,  mental health, cardiac consequences of COVID in sport, ultrasound  and sexual violence in sport.

It also shares and endorses consensus statements of/with other organizations.

History
The AMSSM was established in 1991, when sports medicine was officially recognized as a subspecialty branch of medicine in the USA.
Past Presidents include Jonathan Drezner, Chad Asplund, Katherine Dec, Cindy Chang, Kimberley Harmon, Robert Dimeff, James Puffer, Doug McKeag and John Lombardo.

See also

 Clinical Journal of Sport Medicine
 FIMS
 British Association of Sport and Exercise Medicine
 Exercise is Medicine
 Australasian College of Sport and Exercise Physicians
 Canadian Academy of Sport and Exercise Medicine
 American Orthopaedic Society for Sports Medicine
 American Medical Society for Sports Medicine official website

References 

Sports medicine organizations
Sports organizations established in 1991
Medical associations based in the United States
Sports professional associations based in the United States
Medical and health organizations